Hugh Goodwin (December 19, 1927 – August 16, 2017), better known as Jon Shepodd, was an American actor. On television, he was the first actor to play the role of Paul Martin in the long-running series Lassie Shepodd appeared as a  guest star on Lassie in Season 3 in the episode "Lassie's Day" (broadcast February 10, 1957) as "Al" the delivery man for Martha's Bakery.

He was liked well enough to secure the main role of Timmy's father, Paul, in Season 4 when the series transitioned from the Miller family to the Martin family.

Career

Lassie
As Paul Martin, Shepodd made his second Lassie series appearance in the middle of Season 4 in the episode "Transition" (broadcast December 1, 1957)  playing opposite Cloris Leachman as his wife Ruth Martin. In this episode the Martin couple agrees to adopt Timmy, and to take over the farm for the departing Miller family, who are moving to the city after the death of Gramps. Lassie is given to Timmy by Jeff, and thus remains on the farm.

Both Shepodd and Leachman appeared for the remainder of the fourth season (27 episodes). Leachman, however, did not have a signed contract and left at the end of Season 4, citing her role was not challenging enough for her.  The producers decided to release Shepodd in the wake of the departing Leachman as they felt casting him with a "new wife"  would be difficult to explain to an audience composed mainly of children. The characters Paul and Ruth Martin were thereafter played by Hugh Reilly and June Lockhart.

Films
In the film Attack (1956), he plays Cpl. John Jackson, the orderly to the unpopular Captain Cooney (Eddie Albert). In an opening sequence, Jackson irritates the other men in the unit who are queuing up for coffee, when he jumps the queue. He appeared in such films as The Power of the Resurrection (1958), What Ever Happened to Baby Jane? (1962), and The Garment Jungle (1957).

Death
Shepodd died in August 2017, in London at the age of 89.

Filmography

References

External links

1927 births
2017 deaths
American male film actors
American male television actors
Male actors from Birmingham, Alabama